Experimental Mechanics is a peer-reviewed scientific journal covering all areas of experimental mechanics. It is an official journal of the Society for Experimental Mechanics and was established in 1961, being published monthly. From 1983 to 2003, it was published quarterly, increasing to 6 issues per year until 2009. Since then it has 9 issues per year. The journal is  published by Springer Science+Business Media and the editor-in-chief is Professor Alan Zehnder (Cornell University). The journal occasionally publishes special issues on focused topics.

Abstracting and indexing 
The journal is abstracted and indexed in:

According to the Journal Citation Reports, the journal has a 2020 impact factor of 2.808.

References

External links 
 

English-language journals
Engineering journals
Publications established in 1961
Materials science journals
Springer Science+Business Media academic journals
9 times per year journals